The Wales national rugby union team toured South Africa in July 2022 for a series of three test matches against the South Africa national team. It was the seventh time Wales had toured South Africa in test history. In each of the previous 10 matches contested between the two nations on South African soil – the first of which took place in 1964 – South Africa were the victors.

South Africa took the lead in the 2022 test series, beating Wales by 32–29 in Pretoria on 2 July. A week later, Wales made history with their first ever test victory in South Africa, leveling the series by winning 13–12 in Bloemfontein on 9 July. The decider took place in Cape Town on 16 July, with South Africa winning 30–14 to take the series.

Squads

South Africa
South Africa named their squad for the three-test series on 11 June 2022. Coach Jacques Nienaber picked 43 players, including eight who were yet to win a cap for the Springboks: Evan Roos, Elrigh Louw, Ruan Nortjé, Salmaan Moerat, Ntuthuko Mchunu, Deon Fourie, Kurt-Lee Arendse and Grant Williams.

Caps and ages are as of 2 July 2022, prior to the first test.

Wales
Wales coach Wayne Pivac named a squad of 33 for the tour, including two uncapped players in forwards Tommy Reffell and James Ratti, while flanker Dan Lydiate, fly-half Rhys Patchell and centre George North made their returns after long absences due to injury. Surprise omissions from the squad included forwards Seb Davies, James Botham and Jac Morgan. On 7 June, Dragons prop Leon Brown pulled out through injury and was replaced by Sam Wainwright. Scarlets prop Harri O'Connor was added to the squad on 21 June. Fly-half Gareth Anscombe joined up with the squad on 28 June, having stayed back in Wales pending the birth of his second child.

Fixtures
The tour was confirmed in February 2022, with the two sides scheduled to play three tests in July 2022. The first test would be played at Loftus Versfeld Stadium in Pretoria on 2 July, the second test at Free State Stadium in Bloemfontein on 9 July, and the third test at Newlands Stadium in Cape Town on 16 July.

1st test

Notes:
 Elrigh Louw, Salmaan Moerat (South Africa) and Tommy Reffell (Wales) made their international debuts.

2nd test

Notes:
 This was Wales' first ever victory over South Africa in a test match on South African soil.
 Kurt-Lee Arendse, Deon Fourie, Ntuthuko Mchunu, Ruan Nortjé, Evan Roos, Grant Williams (all South Africa) and Sam Wainwright (Wales) made their international debuts.

3rd test

Notes:
 Taulupe Faletau and Gareth Anscombe were originally named in the Wales team, but pulled out during the warm-up. Faletau was replaced in the starting line-up by Josh Navidi, whose place on the bench was taken by Taine Basham, while Anscombe's place among the replacements was taken by Rhys Patchell.
 Eben Etzebeth (South Africa) earned his 100th test cap.
 Bongi Mbonambi (South Africa) earned his 50th test cap.

See also
 2022 mid-year rugby union tests
 History of rugby union matches between South Africa and Wales

References

2022
2022
2022 rugby union tours
2022 in South African rugby union
2021–22 in Welsh rugby union
History of rugby union matches between South Africa and Wales